Free run is a method of farming stewardship where the animals are not kept in cages but are allowed to wander around inside an enclosed structure, such as a barn. Unlike free range animals they do not have access to the outside.  It is just cheaper than free range, but it is not looked upon as highly as by those concerned about animal welfare.

See also  
 Free Range
 Ethical consumerism
 Moral purchasing

References 

Animal welfare
Livestock